Thomas III may refer to:

 Thomas III of Piedmont (c. 1246–1282)
 Thomas III d'Autremencourt, Lord of Salona (r. 1294–1311)
 Thomas III of Saluzzo (1356–1416)